Ilija Brašić (October 16, 1882 – March 13, 1951) was an Army general (Kingdom of Yugoslavia) in the Royal Yugoslav Army who commanded the 3rd Army during the German-led Axis invasion of Yugoslavia of April 1941 during World War II.

Biography 
Brašić's command consisted of the Bregalnica, Šumadija, Vardar and Zeta Divisions and the Korn Detachment. The 3rd Army was responsible for the border with Albania between Lake Ohrid to Lake Skadar.

He was taken prisoner by the Germans and spent the rest of the Second World War in captivity. 
After his liberation, he emigrated to the United States of America. 

He died on March 13, 1951, in Milwaukee, Minnesota and was buried in the cemetery of the Monastery of St. Sava in Libertyville, Illinois.

Notes

References
 
 

1882 births
1951 deaths
People from Rekovac
Royal Yugoslav Army personnel of World War II
Army general (Kingdom of Yugoslavia)
Burials at the Saint Sava Serbian Orthodox Monastery in Libertyville, Illinois
Serbian emigrants to the United States